Victor Rangel may refer to:

 Victor Rangel-Ribeiro (born 1925), Indian writer and journalist
 Víctor Rangel (Mexican footballer) (born 1957), Mexican football manager and forward
 Victor Rangel (Brazilian footballer) (born 1990), Brazilian football forward